Charles Donald Shane (September 6, 1895 – March 19, 1983) was an American astronomer and director of the Lick Observatory of the University of California from 1945 to 1958, during which time he carried out his monumental program of counting external galaxies and investigating their distribution.

In 1920, Shane received his doctorate in astronomy from the University of California at Berkeley and was appointed as an instructor in mathematics there.

Shane was second president of AURA, and instrumental for the establishment of the Cerro Tololo Inter-American Observatory in Chile, and played a major role in the planning and construction of the first telescopes and buildings on Kitt Peak National Observatory as well.

Shane was elected to the American Philosophical Society in 1955 and the United States National Academy of Sciences in 1961.

The 3-meter C. Donald Shane telescope at the Lick Observatory was named after him in 1978.
Also 1994 Shane asteroid was named after him.

References
 Vasilevskis, S. and Osterbrock, D. E. (1989) "Charles Donald Shane" Biographical Memoirs, Volume 58 pp. 489–512, National Academy of Sciences, Washington, DC, 

20th-century American astronomers
1895 births
1983 deaths
University of California, Berkeley alumni
Lick Observatory

Members of the American Philosophical Society